The arrondissement of Lure is an arrondissement of France in the Haute-Saône department in the Bourgogne-Franche-Comté region. It has 193 communes.

Composition

The communes of the arrondissement of Lure, and their INSEE codes, are:

 Abelcourt (70001)
 Adelans-et-le-Val-de-Bithaine (70004)
 Aillevans (70005)
 Aillevillers-et-Lyaumont (70006)
 Ailloncourt (70007)
 Ainvelle (70008)
 Alaincourt (70010)
 Amage (70011)
 Ambiévillers (70013)
 Amblans-et-Velotte (70014)
 Amont-et-Effreney (70016)
 Anchenoncourt-et-Chazel (70017)
 Andornay (70021)
 Anjeux (70023)
 Arpenans (70029)
 Athesans-Étroitefontaine (70031)
 Autrey-le-Vay (70042)
 Les Aynans (70046)
 La Basse-Vaivre (70051)
 Bassigney (70052)
 Baudoncourt (70055)
 Belfahy (70061)
 Belmont (70062)
 Belonchamp (70063)
 Belverne (70064)
 Betoncourt-lès-Brotte (70067)
 Betoncourt-Saint-Pancras (70069)
 Beulotte-Saint-Laurent (70071)
 Beveuge (70072)
 Bouhans-lès-Lure (70081)
 Bouligney (70083)
 Breuches (70093)
 Breuchotte (70094)
 Brevilliers (70096)
 Briaucourt (70097)
 Brotte-lès-Luxeuil (70098)
 La Bruyère (70103)
 Chagey (70116)
 Châlonvillars (70117)
 Champagney (70120)
 Champey (70121)
 La Chapelle-lès-Luxeuil (70128)
 Châteney (70140)
 Châtenois (70141)
 Chavanne (70147)
 Chenebier (70149)
 Citers (70155)
 Clairegoutte (70157)
 Coisevaux (70160)
 Conflans-sur-Lanterne (70168)
 Corbenay (70171)
 La Corbière (70172)
 Corravillers (70176)
 La Côte (70178)
 Courchaton (70180)
 Courmont (70182)
 Couthenans (70184)
 La Creuse (70186)
 Crevans-et-la-Chapelle-lès-Granges (70187)
 Creveney (70188)
 Cuve (70194)
 Dambenoît-lès-Colombe (70195)
 Dampierre-lès-Conflans (70196)
 Dampvalley-Saint-Pancras (70200)
 Demangevelle (70202)
 Échavanne (70205)
 Échenans-sous-Mont-Vaudois (70206)
 Écromagny (70210)
 Éhuns (70213)
 Errevet (70215)
 Esboz-Brest (70216)
 Esmoulières (70217)
 Esprels (70219)
 Étobon (70221)
 Fallon (70226)
 Faucogney-et-la-Mer (70227)
 Faymont (70229)
 Les Fessey (70233)
 Fleurey-lès-Saint-Loup (70238)
 Fontaine-lès-Luxeuil (70240)
 Fontenois-la-Ville (70242)
 Fougerolles-Saint-Valbert (70245)
 Frahier-et-Chatebier (70248)
 Francalmont (70249)
 Franchevelle (70250)
 Frédéric-Fontaine (70254)
 Fresse (70256)
 Froideconche (70258)
 Froideterre (70259)
 Frotey-lès-Lure (70260)
 Genevreuille (70262)
 Genevrey (70263)
 Georfans (70264)
 Girefontaine (70269)
 Gouhenans (70271)
 Grammont (70273)
 Granges-la-Ville (70276)
 Granges-le-Bourg (70277)
 Haut-du-Them-Château-Lambert (70283)
 Hautevelle (70284)
 Héricourt (70285)
 Hurecourt (70287)
 Jasney (70290)
 Lantenot (70294)
 La Lanterne-et-les-Armonts (70295)
 Linexert (70304)
 Lomont (70306)
 Longevelle (70307)
 La Longine (70308)
 Lure (70310)
 Luxeuil-les-Bains (70311)
 Luze (70312)
 Lyoffans (70313)
 Magnivray (70314)
 Magnoncourt (70315)
 Les Magny (70317)
 Magny-Danigon (70318)
 Magny-Jobert (70319)
 Magny-Vernois (70321)
 Mailleroncourt-Charette (70322)
 Mailleroncourt-Saint-Pancras (70323)
 Malbouhans (70328)
 Mandrevillars (70330)
 Marast (70332)
 Mélecey (70336)
 Melincourt (70338)
 Mélisey (70339)
 Meurcourt (70344)
 Mignavillers (70347)
 Moffans-et-Vacheresse (70348)
 Moimay (70349)
 Mollans (70351)
 La Montagne (70352)
 Montdoré (70360)
 Montessaux (70361)
 La Neuvelle-lès-Lure (70385)
 Oppenans (70395)
 Oricourt (70396)
 Ormoiche (70398)
 Palante (70403)
 Passavant-la-Rochère (70404)
 La Pisseure (70411)
 Plainemont (70412)
 Plancher-Bas (70413)
 Plancher-les-Mines (70414)
 Pomoy (70416)
 Pont-du-Bois (70419)
 Pont-sur-l'Ognon (70420)
 La Proiselière-et-Langle (70425)
 Quers (70432)
 Raddon-et-Chapendu (70435)
 Rignovelle (70445)
 Ronchamp (70451)
 La Rosière (70453)
 Roye (70455)
 Saint-Barthélemy (70459)
 Saint-Bresson (70460)
 Sainte-Marie-en-Chanois (70469)
 Sainte-Marie-en-Chaux (70470)
 Saint-Ferjeux (70462)
 Saint-Germain (70464)
 Saint-Loup-sur-Semouse (70467)
 Saint-Sauveur (70473)
 Saint-Sulpice (70474)
 Saulnot (70477)
 Saulx (70478)
 Secenans (70484)
 Selles (70485)
 Senargent-Mignafans (70487)
 Servance-Miellin (70489)
 Servigney (70490)
 Ternuay-Melay-et-Saint-Hilaire (70498)
 Trémoins (70506)
 La Vaivre (70512)
 Le Val-de-Gouhenans (70515)
 Vauvillers (70526)
 Vellechevreux-et-Courbenans (70530)
 Velleminfroy (70537)
 Velorcey (70541)
 La Vergenne (70544)
 Verlans (70547)
 Villafans (70552)
 Villargent (70553)
 La Villedieu-en-Fontenette (70555)
 Villersexel (70561)
 Villers-la-Ville (70562)
 Villers-lès-Luxeuil (70564)
 Villers-sur-Saulnot (70567)
 Visoncourt (70571)
 La Voivre (70573)
 Vouhenans (70577)
 Vyans-le-Val (70579)
 Vy-lès-Lure (70581)

History

The arrondissement of Lure was created in 1800. In January 2017 it gained five communes from the arrondissement of Vesoul, and it lost three communes to the arrondissement of Vesoul.

As a result of the reorganisation of the cantons of France which came into effect in 2015, the borders of the cantons are no longer related to the borders of the arrondissements. The cantons of the arrondissement of Lure were, as of January 2015:

 Champagney
 Faucogney-et-la-Mer
 Héricourt-Est
 Héricourt-Ouest
 Lure-Nord
 Lure-Sud
 Luxeuil-les-Bains
 Mélisey
 Saint-Loup-sur-Semouse
 Saint-Sauveur
 Saulx
 Vauvillers
 Villersexel

References

Lure